= Donald R. Taft =

American criminologist and writer

- Born: November 1886
- Died: Unknown
- Occupations: Criminologist; writer

Donald R. Taft (born November 1886) was an American criminologist. He contributed to modern criminal law, and wrote many books in the field of criminology. Criminology. A Cultural Interpretation. is one of them from 1950.
